Lonnie Lee Van Zandt (1937–1995) was a professor of physics at Purdue University in Indiana, USA.

Van Zandt participated in the formation of the molecular biological physics group at Purdue and studied the dynamics of dissolved DNA polymers. He also performed pioneering research on the effect of microwaves on DNA. His PhD thesis in Physics at Harvard University focused on the "Effects of Static Spin Density Waves on Electron Transport".

Notable Graduate Students: Bryan F. Putnam (1981)

Sources
Purdue University molecular biology laboratory

Notes

20th-century American physicists
American people of Dutch descent
Purdue University faculty
1937 births
1995 deaths
Harvard Graduate School of Arts and Sciences alumni